Nino Segarra (born June 21, 1954), is a singer, composer, musician and musical arranger.

Early years

Segarra was born in Maricao, Puerto Rico into a family of musicians.  He was always surrounded by many musical instruments and as a child, learned how to play the drums, guitar and cuatro.  He received his primary and secondary education in his hometown.  In 1976, he played the drums and guitar for various local bands, When he was 16 years old, Segarra auditioned for the role of guitar player and was hired by a band called "The Monarc", however a year later he joined another band "Mundo de Ponce" with whom he made his first recording and musical arrangement.

He enrolled at the Inter-American University in San Germán, Puerto Rico, to study composition, musical arrangements and voice. He earned his bachelor's degree with a major in music.

Musical arranger and composer
Segarra began making musical arrangements for theater productions and symphony orchestras.  By 1988, he had made arrangements for Andy Montañez, Marvin Santiago, Eddie Santiago, Oscar de Leon and many other salsa singers.  Segarra also produced and made the musical arrangements for his own songs. Among them Con la Musica por dentro (With Music Inside), El Maestro (The Teacher), Solo por Tí (Only for you), Loco de Amor (Crazy for Love) and Porque te Amo (Because I Love You) (written by Alberto Testa and Giampiero Felisatti in Italy and sung for the first time by Mina with the name "Più di così" in 1984 and only later translated by Pedro Arroyo in 1990), which became a number one hit in the Hispanic community of the United States, Puerto Rico and the rest of Latin-America.

Albums
Que Viva la Salsa (1987)
La Fuente (1989)
Con la Música Por Dentro (1990)
Entre la Espada y la Pared (1991)
Loco de Amor (1992)
El Maestro (1994)
Solo Por Ti (1995)
Éxitos y Más Éxitos (1995)
Romántico Salsero (1998)
Vivo Por Ella (2004)
De Nino a Nino: Homenaje a Nino Bravo (2007)
30 Años de Trayectoria Musical (2012)

Recordings

Amongst some of his recordings are the following:

 Darlo Todo O Nada
 Te Amo Y Me Amas
 Probemos Como Amantes
 Te Deseo
 Me Parece*
 Me Separo De Tu Vida
 Chiquilla
 Ajena
 Mas
 Potpourri "Homenaje A Puerto Rico": Romance Del Campesino / Amanecer Borinca
 Entre La Espada Y La Pared, Entiendeme
 Eres La Unica
 Ha Sido Un Golpe Muy Bajo
 Oh Mama
 Escuchame
 Ven A Mi Lado
 Labios Virginales
 Porque Tu
 Digan Lo Que Digan
 Y Nos Amamos
 Ella Es En Mi Vida
 Con La Puerta Cerrada
 Como Yo Te Ame
 Solo Por Ti
 Me Imagino
 Boleros De Felipe Pirela: Unicamente Tu/Sombras, Me Estas Matando De Mas

On November 10, 1998, Segarra released the album Romantico Salsero, which became a hit.  On September 21, 2001, Segarra joined Eddie Santiago, Willie Gonzalez and David Pabon in a salsa concert held in Medellín, Colombia.  Segarra and Pabon participated in the first International Cup of Salsa celebrated in Lima, Peru, on July 17, 2004.  There he sang one of his compositions Vivo por Ella (I live for her), which he dedicated to the late Tito Puente.  He also toured Venezuela, Peru and the United States.

Charts

Albums

Singles

Later years
Among those influenced by Nino Segarra was his cousin Eddie Segarra who is the lead vocalist and percussionist of "Kinkajou" a salsa and merengue band whose base of operations is located in Dallas, Texas.

See also

Puerto Rican Songwriters
List of Puerto Ricans

References

External links
PR Popular Culture

1954 births
Interamerican University of Puerto Rico alumni
Living people
People from Maricao, Puerto Rico
Puerto Rican male composers
20th-century Puerto Rican male singers
Puerto Rican musicians
Puerto Rican singer-songwriters
Salsa musicians
American male singer-songwriters